Martina Navratilova and Jana Novotná, who were the defending champions, reached the final; however, Lindsay Davenport and Martina Hingis defeated them, 6–1, 6–2.

Draw

Final

Group A
Standings are determined by: 1. number of wins; 2. number of matches; 3. in three-players-ties, percentage of sets won, or of games won; 4. steering-committee decision.

Group B
Standings are determined by: 1. number of wins; 2. number of matches; 3. in three-players-ties, percentage of sets won, or of games won; 4. steering-committee decision.

References
Completed matches (Women's Legends), accessed 2011-06-05.

Women's Legends Doubles